The Nordic Combined Events Championships was an annual two-day competition in combined track and field events between athletes from the Nordic countries organised by Nordic Athletics. Established in 1949 as a biennial event, it lasted for ten editions before holding the last competition in 1970. Men competed in the decathlon and women competed in the pentathlon. The competition was hosted alongside the Nordic Marathon Championships. The stand-alone event was merged into the main Nordic Athletics Championships competition from 1961 to 1965.

A junior category was incorporated into the 1969 championships and when the senior event was cancelled, the junior event was established in its own right as the annual Nordic Junior Combined Events Championships.

Separate from this competition, a Nordic Pentathlon Championship was also contested as part of the Nordic Women's Cup in 1976.

Editions

References

Editions
Competition Venues. Nordic Athletics. Retrieved 2019-08-13.

Recurring sporting events established in 1949
Recurring sporting events disestablished in 1970
1949 establishments in Sweden
Nordic Athletics competitions
Combined events competitions
Defunct athletics competitions